Timbuktu is a 1959 American black-and-white adventure film directed by Jacques Tourneur and starring Victor Mature and Yvonne de Carlo. It is set in Timbuktu (Africa), but was filmed in the Coral Pink Sand Dunes State Park in Kanab, Utah.

Plot
In 1940, France is at war with Germany. The French have removed large numbers of troops from their African possessions, leaving the way open for revolt. American soldier of fortune Mike Conway (Victor Mature) sees a chance to pay his way back to the United States by running guns to hostile Tuaregs.

Wearing a slouch hat and bush jacket, Conway is armed with a Thompson submachine gun and a wristwatch with an alarm engraved "From Conway to Conway". He finds himself walking a razor's edge between an anti-French Tuareg leader (John Dehner) keen for Conway's supply of weapons but keener to use his tarantulas on his prisoners, a moderate imam (Leonard Mudie) wanting peace, the local French Foreign Legion commander (George Dolenz), and the commander's attractive wife (Yvonne de Carlo) who Conway cannot keep away from.

Cast
 Victor Mature as Mike Conway
 Yvonne De Carlo as Natalie Dufort
 George Dolenz as Colonel Charles Dufort
 John Dehner as Emir Bhaki aka The Lion of the Desert
 Marcia Henderson as Jeanne Marat
 Robert Clarke as Captain Girard
 Paul Wexler as Suleyman
 James Foxx as Lt. Victor Marat

Turkish actor Feridun Çölgeçen was credited as technical adviser.
Fred Carson acted as both stuntman and Victor Mature's stand-in.

Production
The film was originally meant to be shot on location in colour and widescreen based on an idea of Small and Frank Cavett with Stuart Heisler to direct. Later, there was a script done by Horace McCoy. At one stage, the film was going to be made by the team of Clarence Greene and Russell Rouse, who were making films for Small.

In 1956 producer Edward Small registered several titles for the film, including: East of Timbuktu, West of Timbuktu, North of Timbuktu, South of Timbuktu (a technique of titling films that William Witney described as "boxing the compass"), The Road to Timbuktu, and Timbuktu Theme. However, he eventually settled on the plain title Timbuktu. In 1957, Anthony Veillier signed to write a script.

Mature signed in February 1958. Filming started May 1958 in Kanab, Utah. Parts of the film were shot in the Coral Pink Sand Dunes State Park.

Director Jacques Tourneur claimed that producer Small thought the film was not long enough so he inserted reaction shots of close-ups of various actors all throughout the film.

Edward Small felt so embarrassed by the film that he removed his name from the final credits.

Reception and legacy

Writer and actor Jacques Lourcelles considers Timbuktu to be one of director Jacques Tourneur's very best films.

References

External links

1959 films
United Artists films
1959 adventure films
American black-and-white films
Films shot in Utah
Films directed by Jacques Tourneur
Films set in 1940
Films about jihadism
Tuareg rebellions
Films about the French Foreign Legion
Timbuktu in popular culture
Films set in Mali
Films set in the French colonial empire
Films scored by Gerald Fried
Films produced by Edward Small
1950s English-language films